Vachagan I "the Brave" was the first Arsacid ruler of Caucasian Albania, ruling approximately from 300 to 336.

References

Sources 
  

Arsacid kings of Caucasian Albania
3rd-century Iranian people